Philip Seth Goldberg (born August 1, 1956) is an American diplomat and government official who has served as United States ambassador to South Korea since 2022. He served previously as ambassador to the Philippines, Bolivia and Colombia and chief of the U.S. mission in UN-administered Kosovo during the George W. Bush and Barack Obama administrations. He has served in Washington as assistant secretary of state for intelligence and research. In 2022, he was nominated by President Joe Biden to be the U.S. ambassador to South Korea and was confirmed on May 5, 2022 by the United States Senate through voice vote.

From June 2009 until June 2010, he was Coordinator for Implementation of UNSC Resolution 1874 (Sanctions) on North Korea. He has also been Charge d'affaires, a.i. at the U.S. embassies in Chile and Cuba during the Bush and Donald Trump administrations, respectively. Goldberg holds the personal rank of career ambassador, the highest in the U.S. Foreign Service.

Early life and education
Goldberg was born on August 1, 1956. A native of Boston, Massachusetts, Goldberg is a graduate of The Rivers School and Boston University. Before joining the Foreign Service, Goldberg worked as a liaison officer between the city government of New York City and the United Nations and consular community.

Department of State appointments

Goldberg served overseas as a consular and political officer at the U.S. embassy in Bogota, Colombia, and political-economic officer in Pretoria, South Africa.

From 1994 to 1996, Goldberg served as the State Department's Desk Officer for Bosnia and a special assistant to Ambassador Richard Holbrooke.

As special assistant to Ambassador Holbrooke, Goldberg was a member of the American negotiating team in the lead-up to the Dayton Peace Conference and Chief of Staff for the American Delegation at Dayton. From 1996 to 1998, Goldberg served as Special Assistant to the Deputy Secretary of State.

From 1998 to 2000, he served as executive assistant to Deputy Secretary of State Strobe Talbott. In 2001, Goldberg served as a senior member of the State Department team handling the transition from the Clinton to Bush administrations.

In 2000, Goldberg returned on temporary duty to Colombia to serve as the first coordinator for the U.S. contribution to Plan Colombia.

From January 2001 to June 2001, Goldberg served as acting deputy assistant secretary of state for legislative affairs.  From 2001 to 2004 he served as charge d'affaires, a.i. and then deputy chief of mission in Chile.  

In September 2008, he was declared persona non grata and expelled from Bolivia, where he had served as U.S. ambassador.

In 2018, Goldberg served as charge d'affaires, a.i. at the United States embassy in Cuba. He has received numerous honors for his work including Presidential Distinguished and Meritorious Rank awards, the State Department's Distinguished Honor Award, and the U.S. Intelligence Community's Silver Seal Medallion.

On May 6, 2019, President Donald Trump nominated Goldberg to be the United States ambassador to Colombia. On August 1, 2019, the Senate confirmed his nomination by voice vote. He presented his credentials to President Iván Duque Márquez on September 19, 2019.

United States ambassador to South Korea
On February 11, 2022, President Joe Biden announced his intent to nominate Goldberg to be the next United States ambassador to South Korea. On February 14, 2022, his nomination was sent to the Senate. Hearings on his nomination were held before the Senate Foreign Relations Committee on April 7, 2022. The committee favorably reported his nomination to the Senate floor on May 4, 2022. He was confirmed by the entire Senate on May 5, 2022, via voice vote. Goldberg arrived in the country on July 10, 2022, and presented his credentials to the Ministry of Foreign Affairs on July 12.

Personal life
Goldberg is fluent in Spanish.

See also
Ambassadors of the United States

References

External links

Philip S. Goldberg (1956–)
Presidential Nomination: Philip Seth Goldberg

|-

|-

|-

|-

|-

|-

1956 births
Living people
20th-century American Jews
21st-century American diplomats
21st-century American Jews
Ambassadors of the United States to Bolivia
Ambassadors of the United States to Chile
Ambassadors of the United States to Colombia
Ambassadors of the United States to the Philippines
Ambassadors of the United States to South Korea
Assistant Secretaries of State for Intelligence and Research
Boston University alumni
People from Boston
United States Assistant Secretaries of State
United States Career Ambassadors
United States Foreign Service personnel
Rivers School alumni